Michael Thomas Modano Jr. (born June 7, 1970) is an American former professional ice hockey player, who played primarily for the Minnesota North Stars/Dallas Stars franchise. He spent the final season of his NHL career with his hometown Detroit Red Wings.

He is the all-time goal-scoring and points leader amongst American-born players in NHL history. Modano was drafted first overall by the North Stars in 1988, and after the team moved to Texas he helped the Stars win the Stanley Cup in 1999.

Modano is considered one of the most influential figures in popularizing hockey in Texas and the southern United States. Modano was inducted into the Hockey Hall of Fame on November 17, 2014. In 2017, he was named one of the 100 Greatest NHL Players.

Early life
Modano was born in Livonia, Michigan, the third child and only son of Michael, Sr. and Karen Modano. He grew up in Highland Township, and due to causing problems at school with his mischievous behavior, a friend of his father suggested to put Modano in a team sport to get him controlled. Michael, Sr. was a fan of hockey, and decided to teach ice skating to seven-year-old Modano. He learned it well, and six months later was put in local hockey teams. As a youth, he was part of a Detroit Red Wings team in the 1982 Quebec International Pee-Wee Hockey Tournament. To spend his minor hockey career with the Detroit Little Caesar's Triple AAA Hockey Club, the Modano family moved to Westland. He made the Midget Major team at the age of fourteen when his teammates were two to three years older. In the 1984–85 season, Modano scored 50 goals and 50 assists on the way to win the USA Hockey National Championship in 1985. As a child Modano decided to pick the number 9 for his jersey in an homage to both Ted Williams, an idol of his Boston Red Sox fan father, and the Red Wings' own Gordie Howe.

Playing career

Minor leagues
In 1986, 16-year-old Modano was invited by coach Rick Wilson of the Prince Albert Raiders to come to Saskatchewan and join the Western Hockey League team. At his very first game, he scored a hat trick, and by his second year, Modano was part of the WHL All-Star Team. Four days after Modano's eighteenth birthday, the Minnesota North Stars selected him as the first overall draft pick in the 1988 NHL Entry Draft. Modano was the second American to be selected first overall in the draft, after Brian Lawton in 1983. Contract problems lead Modano to play one more season with the Raiders.

Minnesota North Stars/Dallas Stars
The North Stars signed Modano on Christmas of 1988, and he joined the team for the 1989–90 season. He scored his first career NHL goal against Glenn Healy of the New York Islanders, and had a good rookie season which landed him on the NHL All-Rookie team and made him a finalist for the Calder Memorial Trophy.  He controversially lost to 31-year-old Sergei Makarov, who had already played professionally in the Soviet Championship League for over 12 years; this led to an age barrier of 26 for Calder candidates from the following year to the present.

Despite the good start, Modano was often criticized in Minnesota as an underachiever who did not compare to the 1988 number two pick, Trevor Linden. This was evidenced by a sophomore season where the North Stars reached the Stanley Cup Finals, but Modano barely repeated his goals and assists, while confronting coach Bob Gainey for his overtly defensive style. In 1992, Modano signed a four-year extension that made him the highest-paid member of the team, receiving $2 million per year. He soon had his best season up to that point, scoring 93 points at the 1992–93 NHL season and earning his first NHL All-Star Game invitation.

Stars move to Dallas
Prior to the 1993–94 NHL season, the North Stars moved to Dallas to become the Dallas Stars. Considering the relocation to Texas as an opportunity for a fresh start, with different expectations from fans and the media, Modano decided to accept Gainey's suggestions to become a more complete player and perform more attacks. Modano recorded a personal-best 50 goals and again scored 93 points. Soon he became an idol in Dallas, becoming the player who sold the most jerseys and received the most letters. During the next two seasons, Modano lowered his goalscoring and had many injuries - a concussion, a knee injury and ruptured ankle tendons - but improved his defensive play. Despite that, the Stars failed to qualify for the 1996 Stanley Cup Playoffs, and Gainey stepped down as head coach, while remaining GM.

Ken Hitchcock was hired on January 8, 1996, as Dallas' coach, installing a defensive-minded system while requesting Modano to concentrate on his offense and using him more routinely - instead of the 15–18 minutes he played under Gainey, Modano routinely played 25 minutes with Hitchcock. Helped by new acquisitions Joe Nieuwendyk and Sergei Zubov, Modano led the Stars to the Central Division title in the 1996-97 NHL season. In the 1998 Stanley Cup playoffs, with new goaltender Ed Belfour, the Stars reached the Western Finals.

In 1999, Modano won the Stanley Cup with the Stars, playing all six games of the finals against the Buffalo Sabres despite breaking his wrist in the second game.  Modano assisted on the Stars' final five goals of the series, including both in Game 5 and Game 6, and final goal. Led the Stars with 23 points in the playoffs, with all seven in the finals on assists. The Stars returned to the finals in 2000 against the New Jersey Devils. Modano scored the overtime goal that gave the Stars a victory in game 5, but in game 6 in Dallas, the Devils wound up closing the series 4–2.

Modano averaged 78 points per season from 1996–2002, and was also one of the NHL's top forwards in plus/minus over that span (his +43 in 1997 was second only to John LeClair's +44 mark). Modano's career high for points in a game is six (2–4–6) against the Anaheim Ducks, and he has seven career hat tricks. His only career fight was against Rod Brind'Amour. He was also a candidate for the Frank J. Selke Trophy (2001), and the Lady Byng Trophy (2003).

2005–2010
As the long-time face of the Dallas franchise, he has recorded over 1,000 NHL points and became the captain of the Stars in 2003. During the 2005 offseason, Modano contemplated signing with the Boston Bruins, but he decided to stay with the Stars after owner Tom Hicks got involved. Modano would sign a five-year contract extension with Dallas on August 5, 2005. On September 29, 2006, Brenden Morrow replaced him as the Stars' captain; Modano served an alternate captain from that time until 2010, a role in which he had previously served from 1995 to 2003.

Modano scored his 500th career regular-season goal on March 13, 2007, with 10:24 left in the 3rd period in a regulation win against Antero Niittymäki of the Philadelphia Flyers with assists by Antti Miettinen and Jon Klemm. He is only the 14th goal scorer to score 500 goals with a single team and the 39th player to reach 500 goals overall.

On March 17, 2007, in an away game versus the Nashville Predators, Modano scored his 502nd and 503rd career regular-season goals in a 3–2 loss, thus passing Joe Mullen's NHL record (502) for most goals scored by an American-born player.

Modano also holds the NHL all-time record for most points scored by a U.S.-born player. He broke the record, which previously belonged to Phil Housley, on November 7, 2007, by scoring two goals in the first five minutes, with the record-breaker being a short-handed goal on a breakaway, against the San Jose Sharks. That night, amongst his congratulatory phone calls was one from Air Force One, U.S. President George W. Bush spoke to him for a few minutes about the record.

November 21, 2007, was "Mike Modano Tribute Night" at American Airlines Center, where Modano was honored by the franchise for his achievements in U.S. hockey. Those who spoke in the pre-game ceremony included Brett Hull, Joe Mullen, Phil Housley, and Stars owner Tom Hicks. Capping off an emotional night, Modano later went on to score the game-tying goal, as well as a shootout goal in a 3–2 Stars victory against the Anaheim Ducks.

With his production declining from 2007–2010, Modano played out the duration of his contract, which expired after the 2009–10 season. In the final game of that season (coincidentally played in Minnesota, where Modano began his pro career), Modano was saluted with a video tribute and a standing ovation, and named the game's first star, skating around the ice wearing a Minnesota North Stars jersey.

Detroit Red Wings

On June 29, 2010, the Stars announced that Modano would not be re-signed to a contract for the 2010–11 season. After contemplating retirement or signing with the Detroit Red Wings (in his home state) or with the Minnesota Wild (in the state where he began his NHL career),  Modano signed a one-year contract with the Red Wings. As the no. 9 jersey had been retired by the Red Wings, Modano went for no. 90 instead. Coach Mike Babcock expressed a desire for Modano to center Detroit's third line with Dan Cleary and Jiří Hudler.

At 5:35 of the first period of Detroit's 2010–11 home opener, on just his second shift, Modano took a pass from Cleary and beat Anaheim goaltender Jonas Hiller for his first goal as a Red Wing.

Modano's time with the Red Wings ended on a sour note when Babcock made him a healthy scratch for his potential 1,500th regular-season game in the NHL. Modano finished his career with 1,499 regular-season games played.

Post-playing career
On September 23, 2011, after 21 seasons in the NHL, Modano officially announced his retirement from hockey at a press conference in Dallas. Modano was the last active player to have played in the 1980s, along with Mark Recchi, as well as the last active player to have played for the Minnesota North Stars.  The Stars signed Modano to a one-day contract to allow Modano to retire as a Dallas Star. In January 2013, Modano became an alternate governor and executive advisor for the Stars' office. He described his role as regarding the "business side of the organization", attracting the involvement of local businesses to the team, as well as getting more fans to Stars games.

In 2019, Modano was hired by the Minnesota Wild to serve as an executive advisor in the front office.

Personal life

During his tenure with the Raiders, Modano started dating Kerri Nelson, sister of his teammates Jeff and Todd Nelson. In October 1999, he proposed to her, but eventually they ended the engagement in February 2000.

On November 30, 2006, singer/songwriter Willa Ford announced that Modano, her long-time boyfriend, had proposed to her during the weekend of Thanksgiving, 2006. Modano and Ford were married in a small ceremony in Athens, Texas, on August 25, 2007, where Brett Hull and Darryl Sydor attended as Modano's co-best men. Ford was asked by the NHL to blog the Stars' 2007 playoff series; her posts were well-received, and her support of her husband quite vocal. In August 2012, Ford and Modano announced that they were divorcing.

Modano married professional golfer Allison Micheletti, daughter and niece of former NHL players Joe Micheletti and Pat Micheletti, respectively, on September 1, 2013. They have twins (Jack and Kate), born in 2014 as well as a daughter, Reese (born 2016) and son, Luca (born 2018).

Modano is the founder and current Vice President of the Mike Modano Foundation, Inc., which raises awareness and funding for organizations offering education and assistance to children and families affected by child abuse, acts with canine rescue and has also united with the Wounded Warrior Project. Moreover, since the start of his NHL career, Modano has affiliated many times with both charitable organizations and the Texas community in general. He has also had his own clothing line during the 1990s.

On January 21, 2007, the NHL announced Modano as the Special Ambassador to the 2007 NHL All-Star Celebration, thanks to his numerous contributions towards bringing the 55th National Hockey League All-Star Game to Dallas and also for his contributions to Dallas hockey as a whole. Modano, the Stars' all-time leader in several statistical categories and a member of the franchise for the entirety of his 17-year career, appeared at selected All-Star events and dropped the puck in a ceremonial face-off prior the game on January 24, 2007.

Modano was one of a number of sportsmen to feature in a series of vignettes for WWF superstar Mr. Perfect, with Perfect playing as a goaltender saving every shot including Modano's.

Modano made a brief cameo appearance alongside then-teammate Basil McRae in the 1992 film The Mighty Ducks. Modano received a membership voucher to the Screen Actors Guild for the role.

Modano is an avid golfer, having met his second wife on a golf course, and playing in some tournaments after retirement. On Mike Modano Tribute Night, both the Dallas Stars and Anaheim Ducks organizations presented him with golf packages, one of which was for the course at The Royal and Ancient Golf Club of St Andrews in Scotland. His golf partner is often former Stars teammate Brett Hull. In the 2nd round of the 2021 American Century Celebrity Golf Championship on the 18th hole, Modano hit a double eagle (albatross) for the first time in the history of the event. The result of his shot going in gave him a tie for lead with John Smoltz going into the 3rd and final round.

Hull and Modano ran a Dallas restaurant, Hully & Mo Restaurant and Tap Room, from 2008 to 2012. In 2003, the town of Westland, where Modano lived during his minor hockey career and his parents still reside, renamed their ice rink as Mike Modano Ice Arena.

Career achievements

Awards
East First All-Star Team (WHL) – 1989
NHL All-Rookie team – 1990
NHL All-Star Games – 1993, 1998, 1999, 2000, 2003 (as the Western Conference team captain), 2004, 2007 (as the Special Ambassador), 2009
Stanley Cup champion – 1999
NHL second All-Star team – 2000
Dallas Stars #9 jersey retired – 2014
Hockey Hall of Fame Class of 2014

Records

NHL
Goals by a player born in the United States (561)
Points by an American-born player (1374)
Playoff points by an American-born player, career (146)
Games played by an American-born forward (1499)

Minnesota North Stars/Dallas Stars
Games played, regular season and playoffs (1459, 174)
Goals, regular season and playoffs (557, 58)
Assists, regular season and playoffs (802, 87)
Points, regular season and playoffs (1359, 145)

Career statistics

Regular season and playoffs

International

See also
 List of NHL statistical leaders
 List of NHL players with 1,000 games played
 List of NHL players with 1000 points
 List of NHL players with 500 goals
 List of NHL first overall draft choices

References

External links
 
 The Mike Modano Foundation
 Mike Modano Ice Arena

1970 births
American men's ice hockey centers
American people of Italian descent
Dallas Stars personnel
Dallas Stars players
Detroit Red Wings players
Hockey Hall of Fame inductees
Ice hockey players from Michigan
Ice hockey players at the 1998 Winter Olympics
Ice hockey players at the 2002 Winter Olympics
Ice hockey players at the 2006 Winter Olympics
IIHF Hall of Fame inductees
Living people
Medalists at the 2002 Winter Olympics
Minnesota North Stars draft picks
Minnesota North Stars players
National Hockey League All-Stars
National Hockey League first-overall draft picks
National Hockey League first-round draft picks
National Hockey League players with retired numbers
Olympic silver medalists for the United States in ice hockey
People from Highland, Oakland County, Michigan
Prince Albert Raiders players
Sportspeople from Livonia, Michigan
Stanley Cup champions